The 1911 Rutgers Queensmen football team was an American football team that represented Rutgers University as an independent during the 1911 college football season. The 1911 Rutgers team compiled a 4–4–1 record and was outscored by opponents by a combined total of 99 to 25. Howard Gargan was the team's coach, and James K. Alverson was the team captain.

Schedule

Roster
The players on the 1911 football team were as follows.
 Henry Clifton Cooper, left end, Palmyra, NJ, Class of 1912
 G. Raymond Robinson, left end, Class of 1913
 Toohey, left tackle, Class of 1914
 Theodore Van Winkle, left guard, Class of 1913
 Julie, center, Class of 1913
 Samuel Furman Foster, right guard, Bayhead, NJ, Class of 1912
 Alfred Bentley Titsworth, right guard, Plainfield, NJ, Class of 1912
 McCallum, right tackle, Class of 1914
 John F. McGovern, right end, New Brunswick, NJ, Class of 1912
 Herbert M. Bergamini, right end, Class of 1913
 Todd, right end, Class of 1914
 Dexter White, quarterback, New York, NY, Class of 1912
 Elmendorf, quarterback, Class of 1914
 Frederick J. Johnson, left halfback, Class of 1913
 Gay, right halfback, Class of 1915
 James K. Alverson, fullback, East Orange, NJ, Class of 1912

References

Rutgers
Rutgers Scarlet Knights football seasons
Rutgers Queensmen football